Euclides is a small lunar impact crater located near the eastern edge of Oceanus Procellarum, about 30 kilometers to the west of the Montes Riphaeus mountains. The mare in the vicinity is devoid of significant craters, but to the west is an area of low rises.  The crater is named after the Greek mathematician Euclid.

Euclides is a bowl-shaped formation with a circular rim. It is surrounded by streaks of ejecta that have a higher albedo than the nearby maria. This nebulous skirt of light-hued material makes this feature very prominent under a high Sun, and it is one of the brightest sites on the Moon.

Euclides D 

Euclides D is a small lunar impact crater in the Mare Cognitum. It has a diameter of 6 kilometers and a depth of 1.3 kilometers. It lies to the southeast of Euclides, beyond the Montes Riphaeus mountains.

In 1976, Euclides D was renamed Eppinger by the IAU to honor Hans Eppinger, a professor of pathological anatomy at Graz. However, in 2002, after Eppinger's association with Nazi prison camps had been brought to the attention of the IAU's Working Group for Planetary System Nomenclature, the name was reverted to Euclides D.

Satellite craters 

By convention these features are identified on lunar maps by placing the letter on the side of the crater midpoint that is closest to Euclides.

The following craters have been renamed by the IAU.
 Euclides B — See Norman.

Gallery

See also 
 Asteroid 4354 Euclides

References 

 
 
 
 
 
 
 
 
 
 
 
 

Impact craters on the Moon